The Inter-Korean House of Freedom is a four-story building located in the southern part of Panmunjom (Joint Security Area). It stands opposite to its North Korean equivalent, the Phanmun Pavilion. It is located 130 meters southwest of the Inter-Korean Peace House in the south of Panmunjom. The Inter-Korean House of Freedom was rebuilt on 9 July 1998 after demolition of the old house of freedom. The building hosted the 2019 North Korea–United States DMZ Summit. It was also one of many venues considered for the 2018 North Korea–United States summit, which would be eventually organized in Singapore.

Meetings 
The Inter-Korean House of Freedom is one of the main inter-Korean meeting places along with the Inter-Korean Peace House.

On 27 April, the April 2018 inter-Korean summit between Kim Jong-un and Moon Jae-in took place in the Inter-Korean House of Freedom. Panmunjom and the Inter-Korean Peace House had been troubled by a negative public image, but after the successful summit, international press now viewed these locations more positively.

Very soon after the inter-Korean summit, On 30 April, US president Donald Trump suggested that the House of Freedom would be a favorable place to discuss denuclearization and a peace treaty on the Korean Peninsula during the 2018 Trump–Kim Jong-un summit. The summit was the first to be held after more than 65 years since the Korean War, and former US presidents had already paid an occasional visit to the Korean Demilitarized Zone (DMZ). The House of Freedom, along with the Inter-Korean Peace House, were the first publicly announced options for possible venues of the summit, when Trump Tweeted, "Numerous countries are being considered for the MEETING, but would Peace House/Freedom House, on the Border of North & South Korea, be a more Representative, Important and Lasting site than a third party country? Just asking!" According to diplomatic information obtained by CNN, North Korea's supreme leader Kim Jong-un had agreed to meeting Trump at the DMZ. The 2018 North Korea–United States summit would be organized eventually, but in Singapore instead of the originally planned location of the inter-Korean border.

A meeting between Trump, Kim Jong-un and Moon Jae-in took place on June 30, 2019. On June 30, 2019, Donald Trump and Moon Jae-in met with Kim Jong-un at the DMZ and Trump and Kim had one hour summit at Freedom House.

Gallery

See also 
 Phanmun Pavilion
 Inter-Korean summits
 Inter-Korean Peace House

References 

1965 establishments in Korea
Panmunjom